Sphaerodactylus parvus is a gecko endemic to the Anguilla Bank of islands in the Lesser Antilles, which comprises Anguilla, Saint Martin, and Saint Barthélemy. It was elevated to species level in 2001, formerly described as a subspecies of S. macrolepis.

Both sexes can reach a size of around 35 mm. The dorsal surface in males is tan to brown, and may be without markings or have a "salt and pepper" pattern of scattered dark scales. Its ventral surface is pale, occasionally with markings on the throat. Its head is yellow to orange.

References

.
.

External links
Sphaerodactylus parvus at the Encyclopedia of Life
Sphaerodactylus parvus at the Reptile Database

P
Lizards of the Caribbean
Reptiles of Anguilla
Reptiles of Saint Barthélemy
Reptiles of Saint Martin (island)
Reptiles described in 1962